Ali Yousef Al-Rumaihi (born 26 August 1981) is a Qatari Olympic show jumping rider. He participated at the 2016 Summer Olympics in Rio de Janeiro, Brazil, where he placed 9th in the team and 16th in the individual competition.

Al-Rumaihi competed at the 2010 World Equestrian Games, where he finished 26th in the team competition and 81st individually. He also participated at several regional games including two Asian Games (in 2006 and 2010). He won a team gold in Doha at the 2006 Asian Games.

References

External links
 
 

1981 births
Living people
Equestrians at the 2016 Summer Olympics
Olympic equestrians of Qatar
Qatari male equestrians
Asian Games medalists in equestrian
Equestrians at the 2006 Asian Games
Equestrians at the 2010 Asian Games
Asian Games gold medalists for Qatar
Medalists at the 2006 Asian Games